Paraxazone is an antidepressant. It acts as a reversible inhibitor of the enzyme monoamine oxidase (MAO). It was never marketed.

See also 
 Caroxazone

References 

Acetamides
Antidepressants
Benzoxazines
Lactams
Abandoned drugs